Bucculatrix aquila is a moth in the family Bucculatricidae. It was described by Svetlana Seksjaeva in 1992. It is found in Russia.

References

Natural History Museum Lepidoptera generic names catalog

Bucculatricidae
Moths described in 1992
Moths of Asia